The National Federation of Motion Pictures and Contents Associations (MPC, previously known as the Federation of National Film Associations) is the main professional and trade organization of Thailand's film industry. It was established in 1991 in order to provide a central platform for the various existing professional associations, and now has 20 member associations. The federation is a member of the Asian Film Industry Network. The annual Suphannahong National Film Awards is hosted by the federation.

References

External links

Professional associations based in Thailand
Business organizations based in Thailand
Film organizations in Thailand